Izhmorsky District is an administrative district (raion), one of the nineteen in Kemerovo Oblast, Russia. As a municipal division, it is incorporated as Izhmorsky Municipal District. It is located in the north of the oblast. Its administrative center is the urban locality (an urban-type settlement) of Izhmorsky. Population:  16,476 (2002 Census);  The population of the administrative center accounts for 41.5% of the district's total population.

Geography
Izhmorsky District lies on the northern edge of the Kuznetsk Depression, which is the basin of the Tom River between the Salair Ridge to the west, and the Kuznetsk Alatau mountains to the southeast.  The southern portion of the district lies on the northern end of the Kuznetsk Basin (the "Kuzbass" coal region).

The district occupies the raised watershed between two river floodplains - the Yaya River which runs south-to-north along the western border of the Izhmorsky District, and the Kiya River which runs south-to-north about 20 km to the east.  The terrain is rolling hills or flat wetlands.  Vegetation is mostly forest and forest-steppe, with pine forests and taiga of spruce, fir, cedar and larch in the south and east.  The forested areas in the north are more aspen-birch in character.

The district is about 100 km north-to-south, and 50 km west-to-east.  The administrative center town of Izhmorsky is on the western border in the center, about 80 km northeast of the regional city of Kemerovo.  The Trans-Siberian railroad runs across the south of the district, as does the R255 "Novosibirsk - Krasnoyarsk" highway.  Subdivisions of the district include 1 urban and 6 rural settlements.  The climate of the district is humid continental (Koppen Dfb).

History
Small villages were originally colonized in the 1700s along the Moscow-Irkutsk trail.  In 1893, the village of Izhmorsky was established when the Trans-Siberian Railroad was built through the area.  The name of the area was brought y settlers from the Izhmorskoy parish of the Penza region.  Until 1924, the area was a part of Mariinsky District to the east.

References

Sources

External links
 Izhmorsky District on OpenStreetMap.org

Districts of Kemerovo Oblast